Lee Mi-Ok (born March 10, 1968) is a retired female long-distance runner from South Korea. She set her personal best (2:32:51) in the marathon at the 1988 Summer Olympics.

Achievements
All results regarding marathon, unless stated otherwise

References

External links
 
 

1968 births
Living people
South Korean female long-distance runners
Olympic athletes of South Korea
Athletes (track and field) at the 1988 Summer Olympics
Athletes (track and field) at the 1992 Summer Olympics
Asian Games medalists in athletics (track and field)
Athletes (track and field) at the 1990 Asian Games
Asian Games bronze medalists for South Korea
Medalists at the 1990 Asian Games